The Dallas Fire-Rescue Department provides fire suppression, emergency medical services, rescue, hazardous materials response, and other public safety services to the city of Dallas, Texas. Dallas Fire-Rescue is the second-largest fire department in Texas, with 59 fire stations.

Overview

Area served
The Dallas Fire-Rescue Department serves approximately 1.6 million people within the City of Dallas, Texas. DFRD is organized into 2 divisions, with 9 battalions, and 59 fire stations for each geographic area of the city. Dallas Fire-Rescue faces some challenges within their district. Including 2 airports, large bodies of water, many high rises, and over 6 major highways.

Organization
The department's current fire chief is Dominique Artis. The department has four bureaus, each directed by an assistant chief: Emergency Response, Emergency Medical Services and Special Operations; Recruiting and Communications; Fire Prevention & Investigation; and Training and Administration. Under each assistant chief, deputy chiefs or managers coordinate specific programs and branches.

History
The Dallas Fire-Rescue Department began operations on July 4, 1872, in response to a large fire 12 years earlier in July 1860. During the interim, there was a disorganized response with delays in starting due in part to the Civil War, The department became fully salaried in 1885.

Chief Artis assumed his role in December 2018 after the previous chief David Coatney resigned to become director of Texas A&M Engineering Extension Service.

Urban search and rescue

The Dallas Fire-Rescue Department was instrumental in the creation of Texas Task Force 2, one of two urban search and rescue (USAR) teams in the State of Texas. It is managed by the Texas A&M Engineering Extension Service and headquartered in Dallas.

Notable incidents responded to by Task Force 2 include Hurricane Dolly (2008), Hurricane Ike (2008), the West Fertilizer Company explosion (2013) & Hurricane Harvey (2017).

Stations and apparatus 
Dallas Fire-Rescue operates from 59 stations. Fire apparatus operated is mainly Spartan however a change to Pierce has started with the recent purchase of a squad & several trucks & engines.

Notable incidents 

Golden Pheasant Fire, February 16, 1964, resulted in four line of duty deaths
2016 shooting of Dallas police officers resulted in the deaths of five Dallas Police Department officers
2022 Dallas airshow mid-air collision involving two planes resulted in the deaths of six people at Dallas Executive Airport

Alarm Assignments
Dallas Fire-Rescue Department has a set protocol for structure fire responses. Each fire is dispatched as a "Structure Fire Reported" and will be one of the 3 types: a high-risk assignment, a regular assignment, or a high-rise assignment. Once a fire unit is on scene and has reported on the conditions of the fire, the unit will either "tap out" the box (canceling all units except for the units on scene already) if there is no fire or smoke showing, or upgrade the fire to a working assignment. If the fire is large enough, "alarm" upgrades will be transmitted, sending additional units to the scene. A working fire becomes a first alarm, if more units are required, a second alarm is transmitted, and so on and so forth. If there is a high rise box alarm, instead of giving it a working response, a second alarm will immediately be transmitted if it is a working fire. The following is a list of Alarm types along with the Units assigned.

Line of Duty Deaths
The Dallas Fire-Rescue Department has suffered a number of Line of Duty Deaths during its operational history. The department has a memorial to their fallen members at the department museum. DFRS maintains an interactive list that explores the individual's lives & the events that led to their line of duty death.

See also
 Texas Task Force 1
 Texas Task Force 2
 Dallas Fire Station No. 16
 Urban Search and Rescue
 FEMA Urban Search and Rescue Task Force

References

External links
 

Fire departments in Texas